The Transports Publics Fribourgeois (TPF) is a renaming of the former Chemins de fer Fribourgeois Gruyère-Fribourg-Morat when the municipal Transport en commun de Fribourg (TF) was absorbed in 2000.

Lines 
The company is a railway operator with both narrow and standard gauge lines centred in the town of Bulle. The main line of the narrow gauge network runs from Palézieux railway station (at Palézieux-Gare), on the SBB main line from Bern to Lausanne, via Châtel-St-Denis and Bulle to Montbovon. The short Bulle - Broc branch, which leaves this line between Bulle and La Tour-de-Trême, serves the nearby Nestlé (formerly Cailler) chocolate factory. The company also operates two standard-gauge lines, between Bulle and Romont and Fribourg - Ins via Murten/Morat. Trains on the latter route have been extended and now operate a regular interval service Fribourg - Murten - Ins - Neuchatel, taking them on to BLS tracks (Ins - Neuchatel).

The Palézieux - Montbovon line was opened throughout in 1904. The Chemin de fer Châtel-St-Denis-Palézieux (CP) and the Chemin de fer Châtel-St-Denis-Bulle-Montbovon (CBM) amalgamated in 1907 to form the Chemins de fer électriques de la Gruyère (CEG), adding the Bulle - Broc branch line in 1912. The two standard gauge operations joined in a further amalgamation on 1 January 1942, when together they formed the Chemins de fer Fribourgeois, Gruyère-Fribourg-Morat (GFM).

The closure of a connecting line took place in 1969, when the section of the Chemins de fer Veveysans from Chatel-St-Denis to Vevey on Lake Geneva was closed. If it had survived, it would nowadays almost certainly have become a useful tourist route from the lake to the chocolate factory (and would link Nestlé's HQ at Vevey with one of its main factories). One contributing factor was the political and human geography of Switzerland (Vevey is in Canton Vaud but Chatel St Denis is in Canton Fribourg). Evidence of the existence of this line still exists at Chatel St Denis, where Bulle - Palézieux trains have to reverse (Bulle - Vevey was the 'direct' straight line route).

TPF operations are centered on Bulle which has a depot, workshops and offers a connection to the standard gauge line to Romont as well as express bus services to the capital. The transfer to the MOB takes place in Montbovon.

Today, on both systems, passenger traffic is carried out by electric units, single driving cars, coupled at busy times to trailers. Standard gauge goods traffic can transfer to the metre gauge where the wagons are transported on carrier trucks. The company still has few metre gauge wagons, all now connected with railway engineering.

Locomotives and rolling stock 
A few vehicles inherited from the former companies and even dating back to pre - First World War days are in use for shunting and departmental use.

In August 2012, TPF, together with the BAM, the MOB and Travys, called tenders for 17 narrow-gauge trains. It was announced that Stadler had won the contract for CHF 150 million in March 2013. TPF will be supplied with six three-unit sets with a continuous output of 1340 kW and a top speed of 100 km/h. The first trains will be delivered in early 2015 and will replace older stock.

Metre Gauge Locomotives and Rolling Stock

1Gruyère is the name of the Region while Gruyères stands for the small town, situated between Bulle and Montbovon

Abbreviations
 ACMV / Vevey : Ateliers de constructions mécaniques de Vevey / Vevey Technologies (now Bombardier)
 AI           : Electrizitätsgesellschaft Alioth, Münchenstein
 BBC / ABB    : Brown Boveri & Cie / Asea Brown Boveri (later ADtranz, then Bombardier)
 MFO          : Maschinenfabrik Oerlikon (later BBC)
 SAAS         : Société Anonyme des Ateliers de Sécheron, Geneva.
 SIG          : Schweizerische Industriegesellschaft, Neuhausen am Rheinfall (now Alstom)
 SWS          : Schweizerische Wagons- und Aufzügefabrik, Schlieren (closed)

Standard Gauge Locomotives and Rolling Stock

Abbreviations (see also above listing)
 Aebi : Robert Aebi
 Asper : Victor Asper Maschinenbau

New Deliveries

Five existing motor coaches 171-173, 181-182 plus one identical vehicle RBDe 567 316 on long-term lease from TRN SA were recently modernized, incorporating new seating, air condition, information displays and video recording. The same modernization occurred with matching driving trailers 371, 373, 381, 382 and 383 ex TRN SA plus one, ABt 204, on long-term lease from TRN SA. Also the two matching coaches 364-365 were treated accordingly. First class compartment is now in the driving trailer and no longer in the motor coach, which had before been classified RABDe 537.

Three new intermediate coaches, all second class, have been delivered from Stadler and incorporate a low level centre section suitable for pram / buggy and disabled access. These cars have large windows and other facilities as featured throughout the train.

Livery 
The trains were painted in a grey livery with a broad orange band below the windows, marked "La Gruyère", a few vehicles even still had the older green/cream livery. In 2001, the first of the repainted units appeared on the line in a plain white livery with lining and "tpf" lettering in cherry red.

Fare structure 
From 12 December 2006, the TPF together with SBB-CFF-FFS, BLS, CarPostal Suisse, MOB, STB and VMCV introduced a canton-wide zone fare known as "frimobil", ordered and subsidized by the canton. It was advertised as "offering freedom and mobility throughout the region".

Vintage train 
The company operate a "Retro Train" using vintage stock and railcar. Operating at weekends throughout the year it offers travel in a 1926-built coach named Moléjon coupled to a bar-coach named La Grevire (built in 1932), the power being supplied by an electric railcar dating from the early 1920s. Included in the price is a fondue followed by Meringues with local delicacy, Crème de Gruyère.

Narrow gauge freight services 
Until 10 December 2006 the company operated three main freight routes:
 To and from the Cailler chocolate factory at Broc, standard gauge wagons carried "piggy-back" on narrow gauge transporter trucks from and to Bulle. Haulage was performed by the branch electric unit of 121-124 series attaching the "piggy-backs" at Broc Fabrique.
 Timber traffic originating at Montbovon, carried "piggy-back" to Bulle, and, on occasions other traffic to and from other stations.
 Ballast traffic from Grandvillard in narrow gauge hopper cars to Gstaad.

From that date the handling of the first two freight routes was taken over by SBB Cargo, the third by MOB. Thus, the company's two GDe 4/4 locomotives, together with the hopper cars, became surplus to requirements and were sold to the MOB in April 2007. TPF is paid by SBB Cargo for conveying the standard gauge wagons on transporter trucks to/from Bulle and Montbovon by accordingly fitted motor coaches 121-124.

References

Sources 
 Magazine des Transports publics Fribourgeois, No.8, January 2007.
 Grandguillaume Michel, et al., Voies étroites de Veveyse et de Gruyère. BVA, Lausanne, 1984, 

Transport in Fribourg
TPF
Railway companies established in 2000
Swiss companies established in 2000